Battle is a small town and civil parish in the district of Rother in East Sussex, England. Hastings is to the south-east and Bexhill-on-Sea to the south. Battle is in the designated High Weald Area of Outstanding Natural Beauty, and is a tourist destination and commuter town for white collar workers in the City of London. The parish population was 6,048 according to the 2001 census, increasing to 6,673 with the 2011 Census.

Battle is the site of the Battle of Hastings, where William, Duke of Normandy, defeated King Harold II to become William I in 1066.

History
In 1066, the area was known for its salt production, with today's Netherfield ward within a large wealthy ancient hundred called Hailesaltede.

The town of Battle was gradually built around the Abbey, and later developed a reputation for the quality of the gunpowder produced in the area. The first gunpowder mill in Battle was built in 1676 when John Hammond was granted permission to build a mill on land owned by the Abbey. A gunpowder works was located in Powdermill Lane – the remains of which have been converted into a hotel.

In 1722, Daniel Defoe described the town as being "remarkable for little now, but for making the finest gun-powder, and the best perhaps in Europe". The Duke of Cleveland refused to renew the licence in 1847 after many mishaps, including one occasion in 1798 on which more than 15 tonnes of gunpowder were left in the oven for too long and exploded.

In the mid-18th century, the town supported five watchmakers in the High Street.

Battle was the birthplace in 1799 of Eliza Acton, author of the pioneering Modern Cookery for Private Families (1845) This continued to sell well for the rest of the century. Its lists of ingredients, cooking times and other innovations provided a model for the cookery section of the best-selling Mrs Beeton's Book of Household Management (1861).

The local Battel Bonfire Boyes is claimed to be the oldest of the Sussex Bonfire Societies. The importance of Bonfire Night in Battle is that it is located in the wooded Weald of Sussex. Most of the area was heavily wooded, which provided oak and other timbers for Navy shipyards, power for making cannons (shipped to Portsmouth or Chatham), cannonballs and gunpowder.

Battle was a refuge in World War I, and tunnels still exist, leading from various fields and cellars to Battle Abbey itself. However, they are deemed unsafe and are now closed.

Governance

Battle is governed at the lowest level by Battle Town Council, consisting of 17 elected councillors who meet on the third Tuesday of each month. The council is responsible for street lighting, allotments and recreational areas. It provides a local voice to the district and county councils. It is split into four wards: Marley, Netherfield, Telham and Watch Oak, of which Marley was the only one contested in the 2007 election. The vacant seats in the remaining wards have since been filled by co-option.

Rother District council provides the next level of government with services such as refuse collection, planning consent, leisure amenities and council tax collection. The parish of Battle falls within three wards. The main town of Battle makes up Battle town ward. The south-eastern area of the parish, which includes the village of Telham, lies within Crowhurst ward. The north-western area, which includes the village of Netherfield, lies within Darwell ward. Crowhurst ward provides a single councillor, the other two wards provide two councillors to Rother District council. In the May 2007 election, Battle town ward elected two Liberal Democrats, Darwell ward elected one Conservative and one independent councillor. Crowhurst ward was won by the Conservative candidate. The electoral ward for this area had a population at the 2011 census of 5,312.

East Sussex County Council is the third tier of government, providing education, libraries and highway maintenance. Battle falls within the Battle and Crowhurst ward. Kathryn Margaret Field, Liberal Democrat, was elected in the May 2005 election with 48.8% of the vote.

The UK Parliament constituency for Battle is Bexhill and Battle. Huw Merriman (Conservative) was elected in the May 2015 election.

Prior to Brexit in 2020, Battle was part of the South East England constituency in the European Parliament.

Landmarks

Telham Hill is about one mile (1.6 km) south-east of Senlac Hill, in East Sussex, England. It was from Telham Hill that William the Conqueror's army first caught sight of the English army forming up on Senlac Hill, for the battle of Hastings, 14 October 1066. In the later 19th century it was owned and farmed by Samuel Carter as part of his Quarry Hill estate.

The abbey is historically known as Battle Abbey. It and the abbey church were initially dedicated to St Martin, sometimes known as the "Apostle of the Gauls". 
The abbey was founded to commemorate the battle, and dedicated in 1095. The high altar of the Abbey church was reputedly on the spot where Harold died. The Abbey gateway is still the dominant feature of the south end of the main street, although little remains of the rest of the Abbey buildings. The remaining cloisters, part of the west range, were leased to Battle Abbey School shortly after World War I, and the school remains in occupancy to this day. 
Battle is famed for its old fashioned but bustling High Street, with many shops and restaurants available either side.

There are three Sites of Special Scientific Interest within the parish:
Blackhorse Quarry, a site of palaeontological interest which has produced many fossil bones and teeth including Iguanodon and crocodiles.
Hemingfold Meadow is a site of biological interest consisting of two meadows with nationally rare grassland species.
Darwell Wood is partially within the parish which is another site of biological importance as an example of hornbeam coppice with oak standards.

Transport
Battle is linked to Hastings and London by the A2100 (A21).
This section of the A2100 was the original A21.

Battle railway station (designed by William Tress) lies on the Hastings Line, north of Crowhurst and south of Robertsbridge. There was once a station known as Mountfield Halt between Battle and Robertsbridge but this closed on 6 October 1969.

The station is managed by and the services are provided by Southeastern.

Popular culture
In Anthony Burgess' novel Earthly Powers, Battle is the hometown of its main character, Kenneth Toomey, where Toomey's father has a dental surgery.

Battle is referenced frequently in songs by the alternative rock band Keane as several of the members grew up in the town. In the song "Sovereign Light Cafe" from the album Strangeland Powdermill Lane and the Battlegrounds are mentioned. Their songs "Snowed Under" and "Somewhere Only We Know" also mention the nearby woods of Manser's Shaw.

British and Irish Lion Granville Coghlan was born in Battle, and later became a schoolmaster.

Twin towns

  Saint-Valery-sur-Somme, France

See also

 List of places of worship in Rother

References

External links

 
Civil parishes in East Sussex
Norman conquest of England
Towns in East Sussex
Market towns in East Sussex
Rother District